The Calcaires à Asteries are a geologic formation in France. It preserves fossils dating back to the Oligocene epoch. Among the known fossils is the kekenodontid whale Phococetus.

See also

 List of fossiliferous stratigraphic units in France

References
 

Paleogene France